DYNU (107.5 FM), broadcasting as 107.5 Win Radio, is a radio station owned by Mabuhay Broadcasting System and operated by ZimZam Management, Inc. The station's studio and transmitter are located at the 4/F Ludo and Luym Bldg., Plaridel St., Cebu City. The station operates 24/7.

History

The station began operations on February 1, 1992, under the ownership of Progressive Broadcasting Corporation as a relay station of DWNU in Manila. In 2005, it began airing local programming. In February 2011, NU 107 quietly signed off and went off the air for a week. On March 4, 2011, the station returned on air as 107.5 Win Radio. A year later, NU 107 Cebu revived its operations online.

In 2016, after House Bill No. 5982 was passed into law, Mabuhay Broadcasting System acquired the provincial stations of PBC.

See also
 Wish 1075

References

Radio stations in Metro Cebu
Radio stations established in 1992